Stretchin' Out is the seventh album by The Jazz Crusaders recorded in 1964 (with one track from 1963) and released on the Pacific Jazz label.

Reception

AllMusic rated the album with 2 stars.

Track listing 
 "Long John" (Wilton Felder) - 4:58
 "Robbin's Nest" (Illinois Jacquet, Sir Charles Thompson) - 5:45
 "You Are Only Sometimes Rain" (Wayne Henderson) - 3:29
 "Out Back" (Wes Montgomery) - 6:03
 "Bachafillen" (Garnett Brown) - 5:53
 "I'll Remember Tomorrow" (Joe Sample) - 4:50
 "Polka Dots and Moonbeams" (Jimmy Van Heusen, Johnny Burke) - 5:38
 "Sweetwater" (Sample) - 3:08

Personnel 
The Jazz Crusaders
Wayne Henderson - trombone, euphonium
Wilton Felder - tenor saxophone, alto saxophone
Joe Sample - piano
Joe Pass - guitar
Monk Montgomery - bass (tracks 1, 2 & 4-8)
Bobby Haynes - bass (track 3) 
Stix Hooper - drums

References 

The Jazz Crusaders albums
1964 albums
Pacific Jazz Records albums